Acrotome fleckii is a species of flowering plant in the family Lamiaceae. It is native to Namibia.

References

Lamiaceae